Zitelmann is a German surname. Notable people with the surname include:

Arnulf Zitelmann (born 1929), German writer
Ernst Zitelmann (1852–1923), German jurist
Rainer Zitelmann (born 1957), German historian, journalist, and management consultant

German-language surnames